Melissodes druriellus, the Drury's long-horned bee or rustic longhorn bee, is a species of long-horned bee in the family Apidae. It is found in North America.

References

External links

 

Apinae
Insects described in 1802